Strikeforce: Triple Threat was the fourth mixed martial arts event promoted by Strikeforce. The event took place at the HP Pavilion at San Jose in San Jose, California on December 8, 2006. The main card featured the Strikeforce debut of Gina Carano.

Results

See also
 Strikeforce
 List of Strikeforce champions
 List of Strikeforce events
 2006 in Strikeforce

References

External links
Strikeforce Official website

Triple Threat
2006 in mixed martial arts
Mixed martial arts in San Jose, California
2006 in sports in California